Ostrov is a village and municipality in the Sobrance District in the Košice Region of eastern Slovakia.

External links
 
http://en.e-obce.sk/obec/ostrov-kosice/ostrov.html

Villages and municipalities in Sobrance District